Kim Chae-won is a South Korean author best known for the dreamlike quality of her prose.

Life
Kim Chae-won was born in Deokso, Gyeonggi Province in 1946. She studied painting at Ewha Womans University. Her father is the poet Kim Dong-hwan, one of Korea's foremost modernist poets (he wrote Korea's first modern epic, Night at the Border), and her mother is the novelist Choe Jeong-hui. Kim grew up with her older sister under the care of her mother after her father was kidnapped by the North Korean government during the political turmoil after the Korean War. Her older sister Kim Ji-won is also a novelist, and both sisters have received the respected Yi Sang Literary Award. They have collaborated on the short story collections Faraway House Faraway Sea and Home, She Was Not There.
Kim Chae-won's childhood growing up without a father has had a direct and indirect effect on her work. In Kim's novels her father is depicted as a victim of Korea's tragic history. The remaining family copes with his absence and decline, becoming tragic victims themselves. The pain and lack in the family that comes with the father's absence and decline becomes rooted as a trauma that controls their lives thereon. The examination of how this trauma may be internalized and sublimated is the subject of Kim's most important literary achievement, the “Hallucination” series. The wounds of Korea's modern history are thus at the bottom of Kim's work characterized by its fantastical and dreamlike aesthetic.

Work
Kim made her literary debut in 1975 with “Greetings at Night” (Baminsa), published in the journal, Contemporary Literature (Hyeondae munhak). Among her major works are “The Hand of the Moon” (Darui son), “Ice House” (Eoreum jip), “Honeymoon” (Mirwol), “A Green Hat” (Chorok bit moja), “Mountain Diary” (Sanjunggi), “The Breath of May” (Oworui sumgyeol), “Summer Fantasy” (Yeoreumui hwan), and “A Wordless Song” (Mueonga.

Kim's writing is confessional and first-person, featuring a single subjective gaze. Her characters often feel helpless and lost, often juxtaposing present experiences with memories in an evocative rather than declarative way.

Awards
In 1989 she was awarded the Yi Sang Literary Award for “Winter Fantasy”.

Works in translation
Wintervision (German)
Espejismos de otoño (Spanish)
Contos contemporâneos Coreanos (Portuguese)

Works in Korean (partial)
The Hand of the Moon (Darui son)
Ice House”(Eoreum jip)
Honeymoon (Mirwol)
A Green Hat (Chorok bit moja)
Mountain Diary (Sanjunggi)
The Breath of May (Oworui sumgyeol)
Summer Fantasy (Yeoreumui hwan)
A Wordless Song (Mueonga)

References 

1946 births
Living people
Ewha Womans University alumni
South Korean writers